The Jalan Ipoh MRT station is a mass rapid transit (MRT) station that serves the suburb of Segambut and Taman Kaya in Kuala Lumpur, Malaysia. It is one of the stations as part of the Klang Valley Mass Rapid Transit (KVMRT) project on the Putrajaya Line (SSP Line).

Station features

Location 
The station is located along Jalan Ipoh and directly in front of the Mutiara Complex mall. It is the only half-sunken station in Malaysia, whereby it was constructed on the ground slightly below the current level.

Schools such as the Chong Hwa Independent High School, SJK (C) Lai Chee and SMK (P) Jalan Ipoh are within walking distance from the station. While nearby residential buildings covered by this station include Sang Suria Condominium, The Maple and The Pano.

Exits and entrances 
This station has 3 entrances. Entrance A being the closest to the Mutiara Complex, Entrance B is located on the opposite side of the road near to Taman Kaya and schools, while Entrance C is located further away from the station near to the bus stop and taxi stand.

Accessibility 
The station is easily accessible from the Mutiara Complex and its surroundings via a non-integrated pedestrian bridge walkway right above Jalan Ipoh.

See also 
  Sri Rampai, similar half-sunken station structure

References

External links
 Klang Valley Mass Rapid Transit
 MRT Hawk-Eye View

Rapid transit stations in Kuala Lumpur
Sungai Buloh-Serdang-Putrajaya Line
Railway stations scheduled to open in 2023